Austrolestes insularis is an Australian species of damselfly in the family Lestidae,
commonly known as a northern ringtail. 
It is widespread across northern Australia, where it inhabits streams, pools, and ponds.

Austrolestes insularis is a medium-sized to large damselfly, the male is light blue and brown.

Gallery

See also
 List of Odonata species of Australia

References 

Lestidae
Odonata of Australia
Insects of Australia
Endemic fauna of Australia
Taxa named by Robert John Tillyard
Insects described in 1913
Damselflies
Taxobox binomials not recognized by IUCN